Susquehanna State Park is a public recreation area located on the banks of the lower Susquehanna River north of the city of Havre de Grace, Maryland. The state park's main area is on the west bank of the river; the park also manages land on the river islands and east bank. The park offers fishing, boating, camping, and trails for hiking and equestrian use. It is managed as a complex with Rocks State Park and Palmer State Park by the Maryland Department of Natural Resources.

History
The park saw its genesis in 1958 when the former president of the Baltimore Museum of Art, J. Gilman D’Arcy Paul, offered to donate 300 acres to the state. The state began its acquisition of land for the park in 1960.

Features
The park's Rock Run Historical Area includes: the Rock Run Grist Mill; the 1804 Carter-Archer Mansion, which was once the home of mill owner John Archer; remnants of the Susquehanna and Tidewater Canal; and the restored Jersey Toll House, where fees were collected for the historic Port Deposit Bridge. The privately run Steppingstone Museum, which preserves and demonstrates Harford County's rural arts and crafts of the 1880-1920 period, is also located on the park grounds.

Activities and amenities
The park's  of trails include the Susquehanna Ridge Trail, which offers views of the river valley, the Land of Promise, the Farm Road Trail and other named trails. The Lower Susquehanna Greenways Trail, which is co-located with the Mason-Dixon Trail, starts at the park and runs north along the river to the Conowingo Dam. The park also offers boating and fishing on the Susquehanna, campgrounds, and picnicking facilities.

References

External links 

Susquehanna State Park Maryland Department of Natural Resources
Susquehanna State Park Map Maryland Department of Natural Resources

State parks of Maryland
Museums in Harford County, Maryland
Mill museums in Maryland
Historic house museums in Maryland
Parks in Harford County, Maryland
Protected areas established in 1960
IUCN Category III